2995 Taratuta, provisional designation , is a stony Eunomian asteroid from the middle region of the asteroid belt, approximately 17 kilometers in diameter. It was discovered on 31 August 1978, by Russian astronomer Nikolai Chernykh at the Crimean Astrophysical Observatory, Nauchnyj, on the Crimean peninsula. The asteroid was later named after Soviet writer Yevgeniya Taratuta.

Orbit and classification 

2995 Taratuta is a member of the Eunomia family, a large group of S-type asteroids and the most prominent family in the intermediate main-belt. It orbits the Sun in the central main-belt at a distance of 2.3–3.0 AU once every 4 years and 3 months (1,546 days). Its orbit has an eccentricity of 0.14 and an inclination of 15° with respect to the ecliptic.

The asteroid's first used observation was a precovery taken at Mitaka Observatory in 1955, extending the body's observation arc by 23 years prior to its official discovery observation at Nauchnyj.

Physical characteristics

Rotation period 

In March 2014, a rotational lightcurve was obtained from photometric observations at the U.S. Burleith Observatory in Washington D.C.. It gave a well-defined rotation period of 11.1 hours with a brightness variation of 0.25 magnitude

A previous fragmentary lightcurve obtained by French amateur astronomer Laurent Bernasconi in May 2006, gave a much shorter period of 6.6 hours with an amplitude of 0.06.

Diameter and albedo 

According to the survey carried out by the Infrared Astronomical Satellite IRAS and the Japanese Akari satellite, the asteroid measures 16.6 and 18.1 kilometers in diameter and its surface has an albedo of 0.06 and 0.07, respectively. The Collaborative Asteroid Lightcurve Link derives an albedo of 0.09 and a diameter of 16.7 kilometers with an absolute magnitude of 12.1

Naming 

This minor planet was named in honor of Yevgeniya Taratuta, Soviet writer and literary scholar. The official naming citation was published by the Minor Planet Center on 18 September 1986.

References

External links 
 Asteroid Lightcurve Database (LCDB), query form (info )
 Dictionary of Minor Planet Names, Google books
 Asteroids and comets rotation curves, CdR – Observatoire de Genève, Raoul Behrend
 Discovery Circumstances: Numbered Minor Planets (1)-(5000) – Minor Planet Center
 
 

 

002995
Discoveries by Nikolai Chernykh
Named minor planets
19780831